Commander Mountain is a  glaciated mountain summit located  west-southwest of Invermere in the Purcell Mountains of southeast British Columbia, Canada.  It is the seventh-highest mountain in the Purcells. The nearest higher peak is Jumbo Mountain,  to the south, and The Lieutenants is set  to the west.

History
The first ascent of Commander Mountain was made August 4, 1915, by A.H. & E.L. MacCarthy, M. & W.E. Stone, B. Shultz, and Conrad Kain via the north ridge. The peak was named in 1915 by Winthrop E. Stone, member of the first ascent party. The mountain's toponym was officially adopted July 17, 1962, by the Geographical Names Board of Canada.

Climate
Based on the Köppen climate classification, Commander Mountain is located in a subarctic climate zone with cold, snowy winters, and mild summers. Winter temperatures can drop below −20 °C with wind chill factors below −30 °C. This climate supports the Jumbo Glacier on its west slope, and Commander Glacier on the east slope. Precipitation runoff from the mountain and meltwater from its surrounding glaciers drains into Horsethief Creek which is a tributary of the Columbia River.

Climbing Routes
Established climbing routes on Commander Mountain:

 North Ridge -  - First ascent 1915
 South Ridge -  - FA 1928 (Kate Gardiner, Byles, Feuz)

See also

Geography of British Columbia

References

External links
 Weather: Commander Mountain
 Mountain Forecast: Commander Mountain
 Commander Mountain aerial photo: PBase

Three-thousanders of British Columbia
Purcell Mountains
Columbia Country
Kootenay Land District